Fidel Cano Gutiérrez (San Pedro, Antioquia, 1854 – Medellín, 1919) was a Colombian journalist, founder of El Espectador, Colombia's oldest newspaper.

Cano attended high school at Colegio de Jesús in Medellín, then studied at the Colegio del Estado, which would become University of Antioquia. He worked at La Palestra, a literary newspaper, en 1872. Five years later he would become the editor of La Idea. In 1879 he moved to Medellín. On 22 March 1887 he founded El Espectador, whose circulation was suspended 6 times by the conservative government, which considered it as "subversive". Cano, as the editor, was jailed several times.

Cano also was director of the Official Printing Office, member and president of the Academia Antioqueña de Historia, deputy to the Antioquia Department Assembly, Senator, and principal of the Colegio Central of the University of Antioquia.

External links
 Biografía de Fidel Cano en la Biblioteca Luis Ángel Arango

1854 births
1919 deaths
People from Antioquia Department
Colombian people of Spanish descent
Colombian Liberal Party politicians
Colombian journalists
Male journalists
University of Antioquia people
Colombian newspaper founders